Derry Ormond is a farm and a small village in the  community of Llangybi, Ceredigion, Wales, which is 60.1 miles (96.7 km) from Cardiff and 173.8 miles (279.7 km) from London. Derry Ormond is represented in the Senedd by Elin Jones (Plaid Cymru) and the Member of Parliament is Ben Lake  (Plaid Cymru).

References

See also
List of localities in Wales by population

Villages in Ceredigion